The Instituto Postal Telegráfico (IPOSTEL) is a Venezuelan public regulatory organization of the national postal sector and provider of postal, logistic and printing services.

References

External links 

Communications in Venezuela
Government-owned companies of Venezuela
Venezuelan brands
Venezuela